Language of Angels is a 2000 play written by Naomi Iizuka.

Language of angels may also refer to:
 Angelic tongues of praise, in Second Temple Judaism
 Enochian, a language recorded in the 16th century, allegedly given by angels
 Glossolalia, the "speaking in tongues" of Charismatic Christianity, sometimes interpreted as the speech of angels transmitted through humans

See also
 Angelic language (disambiguation)
 Tongues of Angels (disambiguation)